Sandro-Luca Molnar (born 23 August 2003) is an Austrian professional footballer who plays as a defender for 2. Liga club Liefering.

Career statistics

Club

Notes

References

2003 births
Living people
Austrian footballers
Austria youth international footballers
Association football defenders
2. Liga (Austria) players
Grazer AK players
SK Sturm Graz players
FC Red Bull Salzburg players
FC Liefering players